In genetics, rs16891982, also known as F374L, is the name for a single nucleotide polymorphism found in the SLC45A2 gene. The SNP consists of two alleles: C (cytosine) and G (guanine). It is associated with skin tone and hair/eye color. It is a type of missense mutation.

C allele homozygosity is associated with black hair in people of European descent, although those with this genotype are usually of non-European descent.

C/G allele heterozygosity is associated with black hair in people of European descent

G allele homozygosity is associated with light skin, hair, and eye color (European ancestry), those with this genotype also have a slightly higher susceptibility to melanoma.

References 

SNPs on chromosome 5